Gentle on My Mind is an album by Dean Martin, produced by Jimmy Bowen and arranged by Ernie Freeman, and released in November 1968 on the Reprise label. The album peaked at #14 in the US and #9 in the UK. In the latter country, the title track became a major pop hit, reaching #2 in March 1969.

Track listing
"Not Enough Indians" (Baker Knight) 3:25
"That Old Time Feelin'" (Baker Knight) 2:43
"Honey" (Bobby Russell) 3:58
"Welcome to My Heart" (Bert Kaempfert, Lee Pockriss, Herbert Rehbein, Paul Vance) 2:23
"By the Time I Get to Phoenix" (Jimmy Webb) 2:45
"Gentle on My Mind" (John Hartford) 2:17
"That's When I See the Blues (In Your Pretty Brown Eyes)" (Carl Belew, Tommy Blake, W.S. Stevenson) 2:37
"Rainbows Are Back in Style" (Dave Burgess) 3:04
"Drowning in My Tears" (Ken Lane, Irving Taylor) 2:25
"April Again" (Glen Hardin) 2:50

Chart performance

References

1968 albums
Dean Martin albums
Reprise Records albums
Albums arranged by Ernie Freeman
Albums produced by Jimmy Bowen